Larentia is a genus of flowering plants in the family Iridaceae, first described as a genus in 1882. It is native to Mexico and South America.

 Species
 Larentia linearis (Kunth) Klatt - Venezuela, Brazil, Bolivia, Paraguay
 Larentia mexicana (C.V.Morton & R.C.Foster) Goldblatt - southern Mexico
 Larentia rosei (R.C.Foster) Ravenna - western Mexico

References

Iridaceae
Iridaceae genera